The blob was the name given to a large black algal bloom that was first spotted floating in the Chukchi Sea between the Alaskan cities of Wainwright and Utqiaġvik in July 2009.

Discovery and location 
The mass was first discovered by a civilian boat from Wainwright, and was reported to the U.S. Coast Guard for concerns that it could have been an oil spill. Analysis of samples taken by the North Slope Borough government and sent to a lab in Anchorage determined that it was a type of marine alga. 

The mass was discovered floating in the Chukchi Sea, a shallow stretch of the Arctic Ocean that spans the distance between western Alaska and the northeastern coasts of Russia. Typical algae blooms are common in similar areas, shallow waters where light can penetrate to the sea bed. However, locals reported that there was no recollection in any communities in the area of any sort of mass like it.

Appearance 
One strand of the mass was estimated to be 12 to 15 miles long. It was frequently described by those who saw it as 'hairy' or 'stringy', with scientific analysis explaining it as a type of filamentous alga. It was also reported to have a distinct odor. Though toxicity tests on the organism have yet to be conducted, concern is minimal as the area is not host to commercial seafood production, though locals do fish and hunt there.

The algae are noted for their color, which is black. This is considered to be unusual for marine algae, which are typically shades of green or red. Several hypotheses have been put forth about the cause of this color. Terry Whitledge, director of the Institute of Marine Science at the University of Alaska Fairbanks postulated that it could be due to the algae having undergone some level of decomposition.

References

Chukchi Sea
Algal blooms